Karimabad-e Hajji Karim (also Romanized as Karīmābād-e Ḩājjī Karīm; also known as Karīmābād) is a village in Gowhar Kuh Rural District, Nukabad District, Khash County, Sistan and Baluchestan Province, Iran. At the 2006 census, its population was 36, in 7 families.

References 

Populated places in Khash County